Methylobacterium soli  is a Gram-negative, non-spore-forming and rod-shaped bacteria from the genus of Methylobacterium which has been isolated from forest soil in the Sichuan Province in China. Methylobacterium soli has the ability to utilize methanol.

References

Further reading

External links
Type strain of Methylobacterium soli at BacDive -  the Bacterial Diversity Metadatabase

Hyphomicrobiales
Bacteria described in 2013